Salma Zain Muhammad Al-Abidin Mahran (born 14 April 1990 in Alexandria) is an Egyptian sabre fencer. Mahran represented Egypt at the 2012 Summer Olympics in London, where she competed in the women's individual sabre event. She lost the first preliminary round match to Polish-born U.S. fencer Dagmara Wozniak, with a final score of 6–15.

References

External links
Profile – FIE
NBC Olympics Profile

1990 births
Living people
Egyptian female sabre fencers
Olympic fencers of Egypt
Fencers at the 2012 Summer Olympics
Sportspeople from Alexandria